The Florence Township School District is a comprehensive community public school district that serves students in pre-kindergarten through twelfth grade from Florence Township, in Burlington County, New Jersey, United States.

As of the 2018–19 school year, the district, comprising three schools, had an enrollment of 1,581 students and 128.1 classroom teachers (on an FTE basis), for a student–teacher ratio of 12.3:1.

The district is classified by the New Jersey Department of Education as being in District Factor Group "DE", the fifth-highest of eight groupings. District Factor Groups organize districts statewide to allow comparison by common socioeconomic characteristics of the local districts. From lowest socioeconomic status to highest, the categories are A, B, CD, DE, FG, GH, I and J.

Schools
Schools in the district (with 2018–19 enrollment data from the National Center for Education Statistics) are:
Elementary schools
Roebling Elementary School with 396 students in grades PreK-3
Christopher Butler, Principal
Middle school
Riverfront Middle School with 694 students in grades 4-8
Jaime Mungo, Principal
Alex Taliaferro, Assistant Principal
High school
Florence Township Memorial High School with 452 students in grades 9-12
John M. Cogan, Principal
Maria Sadar, Assistant Principal

 Defunct schools
 In 1948, during de jure educational segregation in the United States, the district had two schools for black children.

Administration
Core members of the district's administration are:
Donna Ambrosius, Superintendent
Melissa Livengood, Business Administrator / Board Secretary

Board of education
The district's board of education, with nine members, sets policy and oversees the fiscal and educational operation of the district through its administration. As a Type II school district, the board's trustees are elected directly by voters to serve three-year terms of office on a staggered basis, with three seats up for election each year held (since 2012) as part of the November general election. The board appoints a superintendent to oversee the day-to-day operation of the district.

References

External links
Florence Township School District
 
School Data for the Florence Township School District, National Center for Education Statistics

Florence Township, New Jersey
New Jersey District Factor Group DE
School districts in Burlington County, New Jersey